Chełm Mały is a village in the administrative district of Gmina Chełm Śląski, within Bieruń-Lędziny County, Silesian Voivodeship, in southern Poland.

References

Villages in Bieruń-Lędziny County